The Croods is a life simulation game developed and published by Rovio Entertainment for iOS and Android in 2013. It is based on the 2013 film The Croods.

Reception

The iOS version received "unfavorable" reviews according to the review aggregation website Metacritic.

References

External links
 

2013 video games
Android (operating system) games
IOS games
Life simulation games
Prehistoric people in popular culture
Rovio Entertainment games
Video games based on animated films
Video games developed in Finland